Bready Cricket Club Ground is a cricket ground in the village of Magheramason, County Tyrone, Northern Ireland. The ground is owned by the Bready Cricket Club. The ground became Ireland's fourth venue for international cricket along with The Village in Malahide, Dublin, Ireland; Castle Avenue in Clontarf, Dublin, Ireland, and the Civil Service Cricket Club Ground in Belfast, Northern Ireland.

International cricket
In May 2015, International Cricket Council cleared the ground to host shorter format of cricket. The ground hosted its first international cricket match when Ireland played against Scotland in a series of Twenty20 International matches in June 2015.

It was selected as a venue to host matches in the 2015 ICC World Twenty20 Qualifier tournament.

International centuries

One Day International centuries
Two ODI centuries have been scored at the venue.

Twenty20 International centuries
One T20I century has been scored at the venue.

References

External links
 cricinfo
 criketarchive
 Bready Cricket Club

Cricket grounds in Northern Ireland
Sports venues in County Tyrone
Sports venues completed in 1989